This is a list of lists of musicians.

Genre
The following are lists of musicians by style or music genre.

0–9
List of 1970s Christian pop artists

A

List of acid rock artists
List of adult alternative artists
List of alternative country musicians
List of alternative hip hop artists
List of alternative metal artists
List of alternative rock artists
List of ambient music artists
List of anarcho-punk bands
List of Arabic pop musicians
List of avant-garde metal artists

B

List of baroque pop artists

List of bassoonists
List of bebop musicians
List of bhangra artists
List of big band musicians
List of black metal bands
List of blue-eyed soul artists
List of bluegrass musicians
List of blues musicians  
List of blues rock musicians
List of boogie woogie musicians
List of brass bands
List of British blues musicians  
List of British music hall musicians
List of Britpop musicians

C

List of C-pop artists
List of Cajun musicians
List of calypso musicians
List of Carnatic instrumentalists
List of Celtic musicians
List of chamber jazz musicians
List of Chicago blues musicians
List of Christian country artists
List of Christian hardcore bands
List of Christian hip hop artists
List of Christian metal artists
List of Christian punk bands
List of Christian rock bands
List of Christian ska bands
List of Christian vocal artists
List of Christian worship music artists
List of chutney musicians
List of classic female blues singers
List of cool jazz and West Coast jazz musicians
List of country blues musicians
List of country music performers
List of country performers by era
List of country rock musicians
List of crooners

D

List of dance-pop artists
List of dance-punk artists
List of dance-rock artists
List of dark ambient artists
List of dark cabaret artists
List of dark rock bands
List of death metal bands
List of deathcore artists
List of Delta blues musicians
List of disco artists
List of doo-wop musicians
List of doom metal bands
List of downtempo artists
List of dream pop artists
List of drill artists
List of drone artists
List of dub artists
List of dubstep musicians

E

List of electric blues musicians
List of electro house artists
List of electro-industrial bands
List of electroclash bands and artists
List of emo artists
List of experimental musicians
List of Euro disco artists
List of Eurobeat artists
List of Eurodance artists
List of Europop artists

F

List of fado musicians
List of female heavy metal singers
List of female rock singers
List of folk musicians
List of folk metal bands
List of folk rock artists
List of free funk musicians
List of free improvising musicians and groups
List of funk musicians
List of funk rock bands

G

List of G-funk musicians
List of gangsta rap artists
List of garage rock bands
List of glam metal bands and artists
List of glam punk artists
List of glam rock artists
List of gospel blues musicians
List of gospel musicians
List of gothic metal bands
List of gothic rock artists
List of grindcore bands
List of groove metal bands

H

List of hard rock musicians (A–M)
List of hard rock musicians (N–Z)
List of hardcore punk bands
List of heavy metal bands
List of Hi-NRG artists and songs
List of hip hop groups
List of hip hop musicians
List of horror punk bands
List of house music artists

I

List of indie pop artists
List of indie rock musicians
List of Indo pop musicians
List of industrial metal bands
List of industrial music bands
List of intelligent dance music artists
List of Italo disco artists and songs

J

List of J-pop artists
List of Japanoise artists
List of jazz fusion musicians
List of jazz musicians
List of jump blues musicians
List of jungle and drum and bass artists

K

List of K-pop artists
List of Klezmer bands
List of klezmer musicians

L

List of Latin American rock musicians
List of Latin freestyle musicians and songs
List of Latin pop artists
List of lo-fi bands
List of lovers rock artists

M

List of maritime music performers
List of math rock groups
List of mathcore bands
List of merengue musicians
List of metalcore bands
List of melodic death metal bands
List of minimalist artists

N

List of new-age music artists
List of new jack swing artists
List of new wave artists and bands
List of new wave of American heavy metal bands
List of new wave of British heavy metal bands
List of noise musicians
List of nu metal bands

O
List of Oi! bands
List of operatic pop artists

P

List of Piedmont blues musicians
List of political hip hop artists
List of polka artists
List of pop punk bands
List of post-disco artists and songs
List of post-dubstep musicians
List of post-grunge bands
List of post-hardcore bands
List of post-metal bands
List of post-punk bands
List of post-punk revival bands
List of post-rock bands
List of power metal bands
List of power pop artists and songs
List of progressive house artists
List of progressive metal artists
List of progressive rock artists
List of progressive rock supergroups
List of psychedelic folk artists
List of psychedelic pop artists
List of psychedelic rock artists
List of psychobilly bands
List of punk blues musicians and bands
List of punk rock bands, 0–K
List of punk rock bands, L–Z
List of 1970s punk rock musicians
List of musicians in the second wave of punk rock (post-1970s)

R

List of R&B musicians
List of ragtime musicians
List of raï musicians
List of rap rock bands
List of reggae musicians
List of reggae fusion artists
List of reggae rock artists
List of reggaeton musicians
List of riot grrrl bands
List of rock and roll artists
List of rocksteady musicians
List of roots reggae artists
List of roots rock bands and musicians
List of rappers (female)

S

List of scat singers
List of screamo bands
List of shoegazing musicians
List of ska musicians
List of smooth jazz musicians
List of soft rock artists and songs
List of soul musicians
List of soul-blues musicians
List of soul jazz musicians
List of southern rock bands
List of speed metal bands
List of street punk bands
List of surf musicians
List of swing musicians
List of symphonic metal bands
List of synth-pop artists

T

List of technical death metal bands
List of Texas blues musicians
List of Thai pop artists
List of thrash metal bands
List of thrashcore bands
List of trip hop artists

U
List of UK garage artists

V

List of video game musicians
List of Viking metal bands
List of vocal groups
List of vocal trance artists

W

List of West Coast blues musicians
List of hip hop artists

Instrument

List of accordionists
banjo players
List of banjo players
List of jazz banjoists
List of bassoonists
List of beatboxers
List of cellists
List of clarinetists
double-bass players
List of contemporary classical double bass players
List of historical classical double bass players
List of jazz bassists
List of drummers
List of female drummers
List of jazz drummers
dulcimer players
List of Appalachian dulcimer players (also known as the mountain dulcimer)
List of hammered dulcimer players
List of flautists
List of guitarists
List of bass guitarists
List of classical guitarists
List of jazz guitarists
List of lead guitarists
List of rhythm guitarists
List of slide guitarists
List of harmonicists
List of harpists
List of classical harpists
List of harpsichordists
List of horn players
List of mandolinists
List of mandolinists (sorted)
List of oboists
List of organists
List of jazz organists
List of percussionists
List of jazz percussionists
pianists
List of classical pianists
List of jazz pianists
List of pop and rock pianists
List of pipe bands
List of saxophonists
List of jazz saxophonists
trombonists
List of classical trombonists
List of jazz trombonists
List of trumpeters
List of jazz trumpeters
List of tuba players
List of vibraphonists
List of jazz vibraphonists
Lists of violinists
List of classical violinists
List of contemporary classical violinists
List of electric violinists
List of female violinists
List of fiddlers
List of Indian violinists
List of jazz violinists
List of Persian violinists
List of popular music violinists
List of violinist/composers
List of violists

Location or nationality

Africa
List of African musicians
List of Egyptian composers
List of Ghanaian musicians
List of South African musicians
List of Nigerian musicians
List of Ugandan musicians

Asia

Afghan
List of Afghan singers
Azerbaijanis
List of Azerbaijani composers
List of Azerbaijani opera singers
Chinese
List of Chinese composers
List of Chinese musicians
Filipino
List of Philippine-based music groups
Indonesians
List of Indonesian pop musicians
List of Indonesian musicians and musical groups
Iranians
List of Iranian composers
List of Iranian musicians
List of Iranian singers
List of Iranian hip hop artists
Israelis
List of Israeli classical composers
List of Israeli musical artists
Indians
List of Indian composers
List of Indian film music directors
List of Indian playback singers
List of bands from Delhi
Japanese
List of J-pop artists
List of Japanese musicians
List of Japanese hip hop musicians
List of Japanoise artists
List of musical artists from Japan
Pakistanis
List of Pakistani ghazal singers
List of Pakistani musicians
List of Pakistani musical groups
List of Pakistani pop singers
List of Pakistani qawwali singers
South Koreans
List of K-pop artists
List of South Korean idol groups
List of South Korean idol groups (1990s)
List of South Korean idol groups (2000s)
List of South Korean idol groups (2010s)
List of South Korean musicians
Sri Lankans
List of Sri Lankan musicians

Europe

Austrians
List of Austrian composers
List of Austrians in music
Belarusians
List of Belarusian musical groups
List of Belarusian musicians
Belgian
List of Belgian bands and artists
Britons
By location
England
List of music artists and bands from England
List of bands from Bristol
List of bands and artists from Merseyside
List of bands originating in Leeds
List of Cornish musicians
List of music artists and bands from Manchester
Scotland
List of bands from Glasgow
List of Scottish musicians
Wales
List of Welsh musicians
By genre or type
List of British blues musicians
List of British classical composers
List of British Invasion artists
List of performers on Top of the Pops
List of punk bands from the United Kingdom
List of UK garage artists
List of UK noise musicians
Bulgarian
List of Bulgarian musicians and singers
Czech
List of Czech musical groups
Danes
List of Danish composers
List of Danish musicians
Dutch
List of Dutch composers
List of Dutch hip hop musicians
List of Dutch musicians
Finns
List of bands from Finland
List of Finnish jazz musicians
List of Finnish composers
List of Finnish musicians
List of Finnish singers
French
List of French composers
List of French singers
Germans
List of German composers
List of German musicians
Greeks
List of Greek composers
List of Greek musical artists
Iceland
List of bands from Iceland
Italians
Chronological list of Italian classical composers
List of Italian composers
Norwegians
List of Norwegian musicians
Polish
List of Polish musicians and musical groups
Portuguese
List of Portuguese musicians
List of Portuguese singers
Romanians
List of Romanian composers
List of Romanian musicians
List of Romanian singers
Russians
List of Russian composers
List of Russian opera singers
Serbian
List of Serbian musicians
Slovenian
List of Slovenian musicians
Spaniards
List of bands from Spain
List of Spanish musicians
Swedes
List of bands from Gothenburg
List of In Flames band members
List of Swedes in music
List of Swedish death metal bands
List of Swedish hip hop musicians
Turks
List of Turkish musicians
List of Turkish pop musicians
Ukrainians
List of Ukrainian opera singers

North America

Americans
By location
California
List of bands from Los Angeles
List of bands from the San Francisco Bay Area
List of Los Angeles rappers
List of music directors of the Ojai Music Festival
List of musicians from the Inland Empire
Illinois
List of musicians from Chicago
Maryland
List of Maryland music groups
List of Maryland music people
New York
List of bands formed in New York City
List of hip hop musicians from New York City
List of New York hardcore bands
Texas
List of Houston rappers
List of musicians from Denton, Texas
Other states
List of bands from Lincoln, Nebraska
List of Chicago hardcore punk bands
List of hip hop musicians from Atlanta
List of musicians from Seattle
List of Utah musical groups
List of American folk musicians in Washington
By genre or type
List of American death metal bands
List of American female country singers
List of American grunge bands
List of Delta blues musicians
List of The Minus 5 members
List of Native American musicians
List of one-hit wonders in the United States
List of symphony orchestras in the United States
Canadians
List of bands from Canada
List of Canadian composers
List of Canadian musicians
By location
British Columbia
List of bands from British Columbia
List of musicians from British Columbia
Manitoba
List of Winnipeg musicians
Nova Scotia
List of musical groups from Halifax, Nova Scotia
Quebec
List of Anglo-Quebecer musicians
List of Montreal music groups
List of musicians from Quebec
Native American
List of Native American musicians
Jamaicans
List of Jamaican musicians

South America

Argentine
List of Argentine musicians
Ecuadorian
List of Ecuadorian musicians
Brazilians
List of Brazilian composers
List of Brazilian musicians
Salvadoran
List of Salvadoran hip hop musicians
Latin American
List of Latin American rock musicians

Oceania

Australians
List of Australian composers
List of Australian female composers
List of Indigenous Australian musicians
New Zealanders
List of musical artists from New Zealand
List of New Zealand musicians

Miscellanea

List of all-female bands
List of anarchist musicians
List of atheists in music
List of band name etymologies
List of bands named after other performers' songs
List of best-selling boy bands
List of best-selling girl groups
List of best-selling music artists
List of child music prodigies
List of club DJs
List of deaths in rock and roll
List of girl groups
List of honorifics given to artists in popular music
List of instrumental bands
List of jam bands
List of lead vocalists
List of multilingual bands and artists
List of murdered hip hop musicians
List of music arrangers
List of musicians known for destroying instruments
List of musicians who play left-handed
List of nicknames of jazz musicians
List of Pashto-language singers
List of royal musicians
List of radio orchestras
List of singer-songwriters
List of symphony orchestras

See also

Lists of composers
Lists of people by occupation
Lists of singers
Portal:Music